Papilio mechowi is a butterfly of the family Papilionidae found in Africa.

Subspecies
Papilio mechowi mechowi (Cameroon, Congo, Central African Republic, southern Sudan, Uganda, Republic of the Congo, Angola)
Papilio mechowi whitnalli Neave, 1904 (central and eastern Uganda)

Taxonomy
Papilio mechowi is very similar to Papilio gallienus but males lack the distinct androconial patch of gallienus and the discal spots of the forewings have sharper edges. The outer edge of the forewing discal band is more curved in mechowi. Both are members of the zenobia species group. In the zenobia group the basic upperside wing pattern is black with white or yellowish bands and spots. The underside is brown and basally there is a red area marked with black stripes and spots. In the discal area there is a yellowish band with black stripes and veins. Females resemble butterflies of the genus Amauris. Both sexes lack tails.

The clade members are:
Papilio cyproeofila Butler, 1868
Papilio fernandus Fruhstorfer, 1903
Papilio filaprae Suffert, 1904
Papilio gallienus Distant, 1879
Papilio mechowi Dewitz, 1881
Papilio mechowianus Dewitz, 1885
Papilio nobicea Suffert, 1904
Papilio zenobia Fabricius, 1775

Description
It is very similar to Papilio cyproeofila. It differs from P. mechowianus in having the white band narrow. Robert Herbert Carcasson (1960) described it as: "Large, tail-less. Hindwing sharply angled at vein 4; a continuous pale yellow median band in male broken into large internervular spots in forewing. A series of large prominent yellow spots at margin of hindwing. Female has a broader yellow band. In the lower and denser forests of the Congo it is replaced by P.gallienus Distant, with which it has been confused."

Description
The wingspan is about 100–110 mm. The forewings are dark brown. A chain of yellowish spots dominates the wing. The underside is very similar to the upside. But, the basic colour is brown.

The hindwings are dark brown. The edge is wavy. A thin, yellowish band dominates the wing. At the edge there is a chain of yellowish spots.

The underside is brown. Next to the body there are many black stripes and veins. In the middle of the wing there is a thin, yellowish band. At the edge there is a chain of yellowish spots.

The body (abdomen) is dark brown. The thorax and the head are dark brown. The underside of all parts is brown.

Status
It is considered common and not threatened.

Biogeographic realm
Afrotropical realm.

Etymology
P. mechowi was named for Friedrich Wilhelm Alexander von Mechow.

References

Carcasson, R.H. 1960 "The Swallowtail Butterflies of East Africa (Lepidoptera, Papilionidae)". Journal of the East Africa Natural History Society pdf Key to East Africa members of the species group, diagnostic and other notes and figures. (Permission to host granted by The East Africa Natural History Society

External links

 Global Butterfly Information System Images (as subgenus Druryia)
Butterfly Corner Images from Naturhistorisches Museum Wien

mechowi
Butterflies of Africa
Butterflies described in 1881
Taxa named by Hermann Dewitz